Currito of the Cross (Spanish: Currito de la Cruz) is a 1949 Spanish drama film directed by Luis Lucia and starring Pepín Martín Vázquez, Jorge Mistral and Manuel Luna. It was the third film adaptation of the novel of the same title by Alejandro Pérez Lugín.

Cast
  Pepín Martín Vázquez as Currito de la Cruz 
 Jorge Mistral as Ángel Romera 'Romerita'  
 Manuel Luna as Manuel Carmona  
 Nati Mistral as Rocío  
 Tony Leblanc as Gazuza  
 Juan Espantaleón as Don Ismael  
 Félix Fernandez as Copita 
 Amparo Martí as Sor María 
 Francisco Bernal as Banderillero de Romerita  
 Eloísa Muro as Teresa  
 Arturo Marín as Marqués  
 Rosario Royo as Manuela  
 Manuel Requena as El Gordo 
 María Isbert as Margaret  
 José Prada as Doctor  
 Alicia Torres 
 Santiago Rivero as Miembro cuadrilla Carmona

References

Bibliography
 Bentley, Bernard. A Companion to Spanish Cinema. Boydell & Brewer 2008.

External links 

1949 films
1949 drama films
Spanish drama films
1940s Spanish-language films
Films based on Spanish novels
Films based on works by Alejandro Pérez Lugín
Films directed by Luis Lucia
Cifesa films
Films scored by Juan Quintero Muñoz
Spanish black-and-white films
1940s Spanish films